Strategy indices are  indices that track the performance of an algorithmic trading strategy. The algorithm clearly and transparently specifies all the actions that must be taken.
The following are examples of algorithms that strategies can be based on.

Pairs trading strategy. This strategy examines pairs of instruments that are known to be statistically correlated. For example, consider Shell and Exxon. Both are oil stocks and are likely to move together. Knowledge of this trend creates an opportunity for profit, as on the occasions when these stocks break correlation for an instant, the trader may buy one and short sell the other at a premium.
Fed funds curve strategy This strategy takes a view on the shape of the curve based on the actions of the Fed. In this strategy, one puts on a steepener or flattener, based on whether the Federal Reserve has cut the benchmark rate or raised it. This is based on the conventional wisdom that the curve steepens when the rate is expected to be cut, and vice versa.
Implied volatility against realized volatility . In a number of markets such as commodities and rates, the implied volatility, as implied by straddle prices is higher than the realized volatility of the underlying forward. One way to 'exploit' this is to sell a short expiry (e.g. 1 month) straddle and delta-hedging it until it is alive. The strategy makes money if at expiry, the sum of the premium received (and accrued at money market), the (negative) final value of the straddle and the (positive/negative) value of the forwards (entered into to delta-hedge the straddle) is greater than zero. A variation of this, and more common solution in equity, is to sell either a one-month or three-month variance swap – usually on the Eurostoxx 50E or S&P500 index – that pays a positive performance if the implied volatility (strike of the swap) is above the realised volatility at expiry; in this case there is no need to delta-hedging the underlying movements.

Selling strategy indices

These indices have been sold under the following premises, which need not be always true,

 They offer a new asset class that is uncorrelated to conventional asset classes such as equities, bonds and commodities.
Compared to hedge funds and mutual funds, these strategies are very transparent and the client can buy them only if they like the idea behind the strategy.
Some types of strategies also benefit from accounting reasons, for instance, in Germany, Notes linked to interest rates can be issued in the "Schuldschein"-format. This enables interest rate linked strategies to be issued as "Schuldschein".

Trades that can be structured on these indices
Asset Side: These trades are usually structured for institutional clients looking to invest their money in a different asset class. A typical trade would involve leveraged returns on an index with a floor on the performance.
Liability Side: These trades are aimed at corporate clients, such as midsize companies and banks looking for ways to service their loans. A typical trade involves the corporate client paying Fixed – Leverage*Index Performance and receiving Libor + Spread to service their loan. More recent trades entail the client paying a fixed rate below the fair interest rate swap and receiving an index designed to replicate the Libor (e.g. MMI by Deutsche Bank) – such a saving for the client (interest rate swap – fixed rate) is due to the lower forwards implied by the index (by construction) and the client bearing any potential basis risk (difference between index and Libor).

Financial institutions that have bought these products
Several Institutional clients and mid-cap corporates have purchased products based on these strategies. Some major clients include:
Kaupthing (the now nationalized Icelandic bank)
Landsbanki (the now nationalized Icelandic bank)
Pension funds in Germany and Netherlands such as NAEV and Shell
Metro Lisbon
Bancaja of Spain

Financial institutions selling these products
A number of major investment banks have dedicated strategy index teams or are looking to establish one. These desks usually work under the exotic derivatives umbrella at each bank. As a result, it is difficult to establish exactly how much strategy index trading generates at each bank.
Deutsche Bank is generally considered the leader in this business, with Barclays, RBS, Lehman (Now Nomura), Morgan Stanley, Goldman Sachs and UBS all looking to quickly establish themselves.
Considering that it is possible to charge up to 1.5–2.0% annually on these trades, with the usual charge being 1% running, the revenues on a typical 5-year strategy trade are 5–10 times that of a conventional exotic trade.

Disadvantages and pitfalls
Like other financial products, strategies that involve trading strategy indices have burnt the fingers of many a pension fund and small bank. The simplest argument against these strategies would be this: If the strategy is expected to be very profitable, the only eyes that it would catch would be the proprietary desks of these investment banks. For example, the fed funds curve strategy actually ends up being behind the curve as it takes action based on what the fed has already done – this implies that the steepening has already occurred.
However, such argument can hold true for everything a bank is willing to trade. A more serious issue is the danger that past backtested performance is simply the result of data-snooping – especially when signals are plentiful and difficult to justify on economic grounds (e.g. moving averages crossing signals).

References 

Share trading